is a former Japanese football player.

Playing career
Kimura was born in Fukui Prefecture on June 10, 1979. After graduating from Komazawa University, he joined J2 League club Kawasaki Frontale in 2002. Although he could hardly play in the match until 2003, he played many matches and Frontale won the champions in 2004 season. Although Frontale was promoted to J1 League in 2005, he could hardly play in the match. In 2006, he moved to J2 club Montedio Yamagata. He played many matches as left side back in 2006. However he could not play many matches for repeated injuries from 2007. Although Montedio was promoted to J1 in 2009, he could hardly play in the match. In 2010, he moved to Japan Football League club Zweigen Kanazawa and played many matches. In 2011, he moved to Regional Leagues club Maruoka Phoenix (later Sakai Phoenix). He retired end of 2015 season.

Club statistics

References

External links

1979 births
Living people
Komazawa University alumni
Association football people from Fukui Prefecture
Japanese footballers
J1 League players
J2 League players
Japan Football League players
Kawasaki Frontale players
Montedio Yamagata players
Zweigen Kanazawa players
Association football defenders